Last Best Chance is an educational DVD that reveals the modern nuclear threat of international terrorist organizations, produced by the Nuclear Threat Initiative.  The DVD is freely available through the NTI-supported website.  The film stars Fred Thompson as President Charles Ross.

The name of the film is a reference to a quote by Abraham Lincoln.

Premiere

Running at forty-five minutes in length, Last Best Chance premiered in the fall of 2005 at the lavish East Side mansion that is home to the Council on Foreign Relations in New York City. Among the attendees were diplomats, military personnel, international bankers, and lawyers. 

Speakers at the event following the film included:

 Pete Peterson, chairman of the Council on Foreign Relations 
Ted Turner, founder of CNN
Warren Buffett, investor and philanthropist 
 Sen. Richard Lugar, chairman of the Senate Foreign Relations Committee
Sam Nunn, founder of the Nuclear Threat Initiative

The film was produced and funded by Nunn's Nuclear Threat Initiative, the Carnegie Corporation of New York, and the MacArthur Foundation.

See also
List of films about nuclear issues
Nuclear Tipping Point

References

External links
The New Yorker, October 3, 2005

2005 films
Documentary films about nuclear war and weapons